The 2012–13 Division 1 season in Swedish hockey was played from 12 September 2012 to 17 February 2013, with a number of playoff and promotion/relegation tournaments continuing until 27 March. The season resulted in IF Björklöven (which has previously played in the upper leagues of Swedish hockey) being promoted to the second-tier league HockeyAllsvenskan.

Format
The 56 participating teams played the first half of the season in six groups divided geographically. The successful teams then moved into three new groups (the Allettan groups), while the remaining teams played in a continuation of their smaller existing groups. The teams with the worst records in these continuation groups were then forced to defend their places in Division 1 against challengers from Division 2 (see "relegation tournament" below) in a round-robin tournament called Kvalserien till Division 1. Meanwhile, the successful teams from the Allettan groups along with the group winners of the continuation groups played a playoff to determine who would have a chance to compete for promotion to the second-tier league HockeyAllsvenskan in Kvalserien till HockeyAllsvenskan.

Participating clubs

Initial groups

Division 1A

Division 1A continuation series

Division 1B

Division 1B continuation series

Division 1C

Division 1C continuation series

Division 1D

Division 1D continuation series

Division 1E

Division 1E continuation series

Division 1F

Division 1F continuation series

Allettan groups

Allettan Norra

Allettan Mellan

Allettan Södra

Promotion playoffs
The top four teams from the Allettan groups, as well as the group winner in each of the continuation series, qualify for the playoffs. At the end of the playoffs there are four teams left, which get to participate in Kvalserien till HockeyAllsvenskan, which determines which clubs will play in Sweden's second-tier league HockeyAllsvenskan for the following season.

The Allettan group winners, along with the best-ranked second place team, skip to the third round.  The remaining second place teams, plus one third place team enter in the second round.  The remaining third and fourth place teams from the Allettan groups meet the winners of the continuation groups in the first round.

All of the playoff match-ups are best-of-three series with the lower seeded team starting with one game at home, followed by two games (if necessary) on the home ice of the higher-seed.

Playoff 1

Kiruna IF vs Vännäs HC (2 – 0)

Piteå HC vs Sollefteå HK (2 – 0)

Åker/Strängnäs HC vs Borlänge HF (0 – 2)

Enköpings SK HK vs Wings HC Arlanda (2 – 0)

Vimmerby HC vs Tranås AIF IF (1 – 2)

Kallinge-Ronneby IF vs Halmstad HF (2 – 0)

Playoff 2

Piteå HC vs Åker/Strängnäs HC (2 – 0)

Enköpings SK HK vs Kiruna IF (0 – 2)

Huddinge IK vs Kallinge-Ronneby IF (2 – 1)

Olofströms IK vs Tranås AIF IF (2 – 0)

Playoff 3

IF Björklöven vs Olofströms IK (2 – 0)

Visby/Roma HK vs Huddinge IK (0 – 2)

HC Vita Hästen vs Kiruna IF (2 – 0)

IF Sundsvall Hockey vs Piteå HC (1 – 2)

Kvalserien till HockeyAllsvenskan

Joining the Division 1 playoff winners (IF Björklöven, HC Vita Hästen, Huddinge IK and Piteå HC) in this tournament were the two teams from HockeyAllsvenskan with the worst records, Karlskrona HK and Tingsryds AIF.  The teams played a double-round robin tournament called Kvalserien till HockeyAllsvenskan, with the top two teams playing the 2013–14 season in HockeyAllsvenskan and the remaining four playing in Division 1.

Umeå-based IF Björklöven, who were Swedish champions in 1987 and were in Sweden's top hockey league as recently as 2001, finished first in the standings, resulting in their return to HockeyAllsvenskan three years after their 2010 demotion to Division 1 due to financial difficulties.

The second and final spot in HockeyAllsvenskan was decided dramatically in the final round.  Karlskrona went into the final round one point ahead of Tingsryd in the standings.  Each team ended up losing their final match in game winning shots, resulting in Tingsryd being demoted to the 2013–14 Division 1 season.

Relegation tournaments
The worst teams from each continuation series play a relegation tournament called Kvalserien till Division 1 with the winners from Division 2, in order to qualify for the 2013–14 Division 1 season.

Division 1 was contracted to 53 teams for the 2013–14 season. This, along with the fact that some clubs chose not to contest relegation, caused some situations where a team was relegated without a team being promoted, or vice versa.

Kvalserie A
Kvalserie A resulted in Kalix UHC retaining their spot in Division 1, and Bodens HF being demoted to Division 2 for 2013–14.

Kvalserie B
From group B, Njurunda SK, who finished last in Division 1B's continuation round, elected to drop out of Division 1 prior to the start of Kvalserien.  What resulted was a competition with two Division 1B teams (Brunflo IK and Kramfors-Alliansen) competing over a single Division 1 spot against two challengers from Division 2 (Husum HK and IFK Nyland).  Kvalserie B ended with Brunflo IK in first place, successfully defending their position in Division 1, and with Kramfors-Alliansen being demoted to Division 2 for the 2013–14 season.

Kvalserie C

Kvalserie D
From group D, Järfälla HC opted not to defend their spot in Division 1 due to their financial situation, and thereby accepted relegation to Division 2.  This meant that there was an open spot available in Division 1D for one of the challengers from Division 2, Bajen Fans IF, Haninge HF and Värmdö HC.  Kvalserie D resulted in Bajen Fans IF (which the following off-season was renamed Hammarby Hockey) winning the group, thereby securing promotion, while Nacka HK came in second, thereby successfully defending their spot in Division 1.

Kvalserie E

Kvalserie F

References

3
Swedish Division I seasons